"Winner at a Losing Game" is a song written and recorded by American country music group Rascal Flatts. It was released in October 2007 as the second single from their album Still Feels Good, as well as their nineteenth chart single overall.  The song peaked at number 2 on the Billboard Hot Country Songs charts in February 2008, spending four weeks at that position behind "Letter to Me" by Brad Paisley.

History
Rascal Flatts' three members (Gary LeVox, Jay DeMarcus, and Joe Don Rooney) wrote the song on their tour bus after a show late one night. According to DeMarcus, the trio began a conversation about their musical influences, when the Eagles, a popular soft rock band, was mentioned. Inspired by the fact that they would be performing with the Eagles at the 2007 Grammy Awards, the trio decided to write a song that was stylistically similar to the music of the Eagles.

All three members then began to write the song that night. They came up with a verse and chorus that, according to Country Weekly, "achingly express[es] a feeling we have all experienced — loving someone who just doesn't love you the same way". The next day, DeMarcus added the hook "If love is really forever, then I'm a winner at a losing game", and the song was soon finished.

LeVox, the lead singer of Rascal Flatts, considers the song special because it is the first single to be written entirely by the band's three members.

Critical reception
Ken Tucker of Billboard wrote that the song is "fresh, familiar and conjures '70s country rock".

Chart performance

Year-end charts

References

2007 singles
2007 songs
Rascal Flatts songs
Songs written by Jay DeMarcus
Songs written by Gary LeVox
Song recordings produced by Dann Huff
Lyric Street Records singles